Imogen Binnie is an American transgender novelist who made her debut with the publication of Nevada in 2013.

Early life
Binnie was born and raised in New Jersey. She attended Rutgers University and graduated in 2002 after majoring in English and psychology.

Career 
Binnie's debut novel, Nevada, was published by Topside Press in 2013. The novel's plot centres around Maria, a trans woman leaving New York after a break up, and is intended to primarily address a transgender audience.

At the 26th Lambda Literary Awards in 2014, Nevada was a shortlisted nominee in the Transgender Fiction category, and Binnie won both the Betty Berzon Emerging Writer Award and the MOTHA award for "outstanding contribution to the transgender cultural landscape".

Binnie has published several short stories, including "Gamers", in Meanwhile, Elsewhere (Topside Press, 2017), “If You Leave” in Videogames for Humans (Instar, 2017), and "I Met a Girl Named Bat Who Met Jeffrey Palmer" published in the Lambda Award winning collection, The Collection: Short Fiction from the Transgender Vanguard (Topside Press, 2012).

Binnie was a script writer for Doubt, a short-lived American TV drama which premiered on CBS in 2017. She wrote the Aug. 5, 2017, episode "I'm In If You Are."

In 2020, she was a script writer for Council of Dads, an American TV drama which premiered on NBC. She wrote the May 28, 2020, fifth episode "Tradition!"

Most recently, Binnie co-wrote and was the executive story editor for teen drama Cruel Summer. Binnie was a columnist at Maximum Rocknroll magazine for 9 years. Her early writing appeared in two zines she self-published, The Fact That It's Funny Doesn't Make It A Joke and Stereotype Threat.

In 2021, Picador signed Nevada for publication in the UK for the first time, citing it as a "genuinely ground-breaking book, which has trenchant and inspired things to say about the trans experience". This same year, MCD announced it would reissue the book for wider distribution than the original run.

References 

Living people
21st-century American novelists
American women novelists
Transgender novelists
Transgender women
American LGBT novelists
American LGBT screenwriters
LGBT people from New Jersey
Rutgers University alumni
21st-century American women writers
Year of birth missing (living people)
21st-century American screenwriters
American transgender writers